Lithops ruschiorum is a species of plant in the family Aizoaceae. It is endemic to Namibia.  Its natural habitats are rocky areas and cold desert.

References

ruschiorum
Endemic flora of Namibia
Least concern plants
Taxonomy articles created by Polbot
Taxa named by N. E. Brown
Taxa named by Kurt Dinter
Taxa named by Martin Heinrich Gustav Schwantes